is a Japanese type of skewered  chicken. Afterwards, they are grilled over a charcoal fire. During or after cooking, the meat is typically seasoned with tare sauce or salt. The term is sometimes used informally for kushiyaki (grilled and skewered foods) in general.

Preparation
As they are designed for convenience and portability, yakitori are typically cooked using step-by-step methods. Traditionally, it was accomplished using portable charcoal grills. That is the method most often employed by yatai, however, restaurants may use stationary grills and, depending on the situation, higher quality binchōtan charcoal.

Yakitori-ki are small electrical appliances that use a heating element similar to that of a broiler or toaster to cook the food placed on top.

To facilitate even cooking, the meat is cut into small, roughly uniform shapes and then skewered with kushi; after which the yakitori are seasoned and cooked. Charcoal is the preferred method of cooking as it produces high heat and strong flames while giving off little to no water vapor. This allows for the ingredients to cook quickly while imparting a crunchy texture to the skin. While gas and electric heat sources can be used, they do not develop the same aromas or textures as charcoal-cooked yakitori.

Seasoning
Yakitori seasonings are primarily divided into two types: salty or salty-sweet. The salty type usually uses plain salt as its main seasoning. For the salty-sweet variety, tare, a special sauce consisting of mirin, sake, soy sauce, and sugar is used. Other common spices include powdered cayenne pepper, shichimi, Japanese pepper, black pepper, and wasabi, according to one's tastes.

Sales
 are small shops specializing in yakitori. They usually take the form of a compact shop offering take-out services only, but sit-down restaurants and restaurant chains are also popular.

Yakitori is not limited to speciality shops: It is readily found on the menus of izakaya all across Japan and is sold pre-cooked, as frozen vacuum packs, or even canned. The latter was made popular by Hotei Foods Corporation, the first company that started selling yakitori-in-can in 1970, with nine flavors as of 2016. Their TV commercial song has been iconic to their brand name.

Due to its ease of preparation and portability, yakitori is a very popular street food, often sold from small carts and stalls known as yatai. Yatai are found, among other places, dotting streets during festivals or on heavily trafficked routes during the evening commute where customers enjoy beer and sake with yakitori.

Examples
Due to a wide diversity in cuts and preparation methods, yakitori takes on many forms. Some popular examples include:
 momo (もも), chicken thigh 
 hasami (はさみ), gizzard and spring onion
 sasami (ささみ), breast meat
 negima (ねぎま), chicken and spring onion 
 tsukune (つくね), chicken meatballs
 (tori)kawa ((とり)かわ), chicken skin, grilled until crispy
 tebasaki (手羽先), chicken wing
 bonjiri (ぼんじり), chicken tail
 shiro (シロ), chicken small intestines
 nankotsu (なんこつ), chicken cartilage
 hāto / hatsu (ハート / ハツ) or kokoro (こころ), chicken heart
 rebā (レバー), liver
 sunagimo (砂肝) or zuri (ずり), chicken gizzard
 toriniku (鶏肉), all white meat on skewer
 yotsumi (四つ身), pieces of chicken breast

Gallery

See also

 Brochette – similar skewered food in France
 Chuanr – similar skewered food in China
 Dak-kkochi – similar skewered food in Korea
 Japanese cuisine
 List of chicken dishes
 List of kebabs
 Nem nướng – similar skewered food in Vietnam
 Satay – similar skewered food in Southeast Asia and Sri Lanka
 Shashlik
 Souvlaki – similar skewered food in Greece

References

Further reading
 Ono, Tadashi; Salat Harris (2011).  The Japanese Grill: From Classic Yakitori to Steak, Seafood, and Vegetables. Ten Speed Press.

External links

 Japan Guide
 Everyday Japanese Cuisine

Japanese meat dishes
Japanese chicken dishes
Grilled skewers
Street food
Japanese cuisine terms